Same-sex marriage is legal in Puebla in accordance with a ruling from the Supreme Court of Justice of the Nation. On 1 August 2017, the Supreme Court ruled that the same-sex marriage ban containted in the state's Civil Code violated Articles 1 and 4 of the Constitution of Mexico, legalizing same-sex marriage in the state of Puebla. The ruling was officially published in the Official Journal of the Federation on 16 February 2018.

The Congress of Puebla passed a same-sex marriage bill on 3 November 2020, amending various articles of the Civil Code to reflect the Supreme Court ruling.

Legal history

Background

An important recognition case was granted via amparo on 29 January 2014. A same-sex couple, married in 2012 in Mexico City, filed an amparo against the IMSS (Instituto Mexicano del Seguro Social) after it refused to register one of the partners for spousal benefits. In a landmark ruling, the Supreme Court ruled that the IMSS was required to recognize the marriage.

On 15 October 2014, a collective amparo for 13 couples was filed with the support of Equal Marriage Mexico, the Citizens Observatory of Sexual and Reproductive Rights and El Taller A.C.. It sought to have the state's same-sex marriage ban declared unconstitutional and allow the couples to marry. In March 2015, reports surfaced that a judge had ruled against the couples citing the requirement that they "prove their homosexuality". Activists slammed this as a delay tactic and appealed to the Mexican Supreme Court. On 5 May 2016, the Supreme Court ruled that the state's same-sex marriage ban was unconstitutional and discriminatory, and allowed the couples to marry. On 1 June 2016, the First Chamber of the Mexican Supreme Court made a similar ruling in a case involving 15 couples.

In November 2014, a federal court granted Guadalupe del Carmen Gómez Tetetla and Fabiola Lucero Méndeza an amparo. The couple had filed the amparo earlier that year after their request for a marriage license was rejected. The state appealed the decision, and an appellate court upheld the ruling in favor of the couple on 10 July 2015. Their wedding, which was the first same-sex marriage in the state of Puebla, took place on 1 August 2015. The Mexican Supreme Court ruled on 12 June 2015 that state bans on same-sex marriage are unconstitutional nationwide. The court's ruling is considered a "jurisprudential thesis" and did not invalidate state laws, meaning that same-sex couples denied the right to wed would still have to seek individual amparos in court. The ruling standardized the procedures for judges and courts throughout Mexico to approve all applications for same-sex marriages and made the approval mandatory.

In September 2016, officials in the municipality of San Pedro Cholula announced that any same-sex couple who wishes to marry in the municipality may do so without hindrance, citing nationwide jurisprudence established by the Supreme Court.

Attempts to pass civil union legislation
On 7 December 2006, a civil union bill, similar to that of Mexico City, was proposed in Puebla, but it faced strong opposition and criticism from deputies of the Institutional Revolutionary Party (PRI) and the National Action Party (PAN), which declared that "the traditional family is the only social model, and there cannot be another one." The civil union bill was proposed again on 15 March 2011. After five reviews in the ensuing years, on 8 June 2014 the bill was postponed until a later legislative session. On 29 September 2014, Congress announced that there would be no discussion in that legislative term. Activists organized a march on 8 November 2014 urging the Congress of Puebla to legalize same-sex marriage.

Congress rejected a civil union bill in December 2014. The Party of the Democratic Revolution (PRD), which had supported the measure, announced its intention to re-introduce a similar bill in 2015. On 11 June 2015, a PRD deputy submitted a marriage bill instead, citing national court decisions in favor of same-sex marriage. In June 2016, state officials announced they would postpone any vote on the legislation until the Mexican Supreme Court ruled on the action of unconstitutionality filed in April 2016 (which it did in August 2017).

Action of unconstitutionality (2016–2017)

On 27 April 2016, the National Human Rights Commission filed an action of unconstitutionality (acción de inconstitucionalidad; docketed 29/2016) against the state of Puebla, contesting the constitutionality of articles 294, 297 and 300 of the Civil Code. The Congress of Puebla had recently amended state family law but while doing so did not repeal the state's ban on same-sex marriage. The Commission took this opportunity to file the action of unconstitutionality. Article 294 defined marriage as the union of "a man and a woman" and whose goal was "perpetuating the species", and article 297 similarly defined concubinage as between "a man and a woman". Article 300 required the "man and woman" to be at least 16 years of age. This lawsuit sought to fully legalize same-sex marriage in Puebla, similarly to what had happened in the states of Chiapas (in case 32/2016) and Jalisco (in case 28/2015).

On 1 August 2017, the Mexican Supreme Court ruled unanimously that the three articles violated Articles 1 and 4 of the Constitution of Mexico. Article 1 of the Constitution states that "any form of discrimination, based on ethnic or national origin, gender, age, disabilities, social status, medical conditions, religion, opinions, sexual orientation, marital status, or any other form, which violates the human dignity or seeks to annul or diminish the rights and freedoms of the people, is prohibited.", and Article 4 relates to matrimonial equality, stating that "man and woman are equal under the law. The law shall protect the organization and development of the family." In late January 2018, despite opposition from Congress, the civil registry announced it would abide by the ruling and start processing marriage applications from same-sex couples. The ruling came into effect once Congress was officially notified and upon publication in the Official Gazette of the Federation (Diario Oficial de la Federación) on 16 February 2018. In addition, state officials have confirmed that same-sex couples are allowed to adopt.

Response and passage of legislation in Congress
In October 2018, Deputy María García Olmedo from the Institutional Revolutionary Party introduced a bill to Congress to codify same-sex marriage in the state's Civil Code.

On 4 October 2019, a Congress committee voted against decriminalizing abortion and updating state law to reflect the Supreme Court's ruling on same-sex marriage. Legislators reaffirmed the then-current state law which read, "El matrimonio es un contrato civil, por el cual un sólo hombre y una sola mujer, se unen en sociedad para perpetuar la especie y ayudarse en la lucha por la existencia." ("Marriage is a civil contract, in which one man and one woman are united by society to perpetuate the species and help each other in the struggle for existence."). This did not affect the status of same-sex marriage in Puebla, which remained legal and recognized. Shortly following the vote, Deputy García Olmedo filed a legal challenge with the Supreme Court, arguing that Congress' refusal to amend state law to recognize same-sex marriages in accordance with the Supreme Court ruling was unconstitutional. García Olmedo also accused deputies of the National Regeneration Movement (MORENA), who mostly voted for the measure, of "betrayal", as the party was elected on a platform supporting LGBT rights and same-sex marriage.

On 30 October 2020, a Congress committee voted 4–2 with 1 abstention in favor of a same-sex marriage bill introduced by Deputy Vianey García Romero. On 3 November 2020, Congress approved the legislation 31–5. The law was published in the official state journal on 10 November, following Governor Miguel Barbosa Huerta's signature, and took effect the following day. Article 294 of the Civil Code now reads:

 in Spanish: 
 (Marriage is a civil contract in which two people are united voluntarily by society, to build a community of life, with respect, mutual aid and equal rights and obligations.)

Marriage statistics
The following table shows the number of same-sex marriages performed in Puebla since 2019 as reported by the National Institute of Statistics and Geography. Figures for 2020 are lower than previous years because of the restrictions in place due to the COVID-19 pandemic.

121 same-sex marriages were performed in Puebla in 2021; 66 between two women and 55 between two men. Most took place in Puebla de Zaragoza at 81, followed by San Pedro Cholula at 23, San Martín Texmelucan at 3, and 14 in other cities across the state.

Public opinion
A 2017 opinion poll conducted by Gabinete de Comunicación Estratégica found that 48.5% of Puebla residents supported same-sex marriage, while 48% were opposed.

According to a 2018 survey by the National Institute of Statistics and Geography, 37% of the Puebla public opposed same-sex marriage.

See also

 Same-sex marriage in Mexico
 LGBT rights in Mexico

Notes

References

External links
 Text of the Puebla same-sex marriage law in Spanish

Puebla
Puebla
2017 in LGBT history